Meet Oliver Nelson is the debut album by saxophonist Oliver Nelson recorded in 1959 and released on the New Jazz label.

Reception

The Allmusic site awarded the album 4 stars stating "Although none of these Nelson tunes caught on, this was an impressive beginning to a short but productive career and gives one a strong example of the multi-talented Nelson's tenor playing".

Track listing 
All compositions by Oliver Nelson except as indicated
 "Jams and Jellies" - 7:03
 "Passion Flower" (Milt Raskin, Billy Strayhorn) - 6:51
 "Don't Stand Up" - 3:44
 "Ostinato" - 5:31
 "What's New?" (Johnny Burke, Bob Haggart) - 6:53
 "Booze Blues Baby" - 6:32

Personnel 
Oliver Nelson - tenor saxophone
Kenny Dorham - trumpet
Ray Bryant - piano
Wendell Marshall - bass
Art Taylor - drums

References 

Oliver Nelson albums
1959 albums
Albums produced by Esmond Edwards
Albums recorded at Van Gelder Studio
New Jazz Records albums